Tomáš Demel (born 26 June 1978) is a Czech ice hockey coach and former professional player who is currently serving as head coach of AHC Vinschgau - Val Venosta of Italian Hockey League - Division I, the third level league in Italy.

Demel has won the Czech Extraliga three times, all with the HC Vsetin: 1997-1998, 1998-1999 and 2000-2001.

References

External links

Living people
HC Slovan Bratislava players
Czech ice hockey forwards
1978 births
Sportspeople from Nový Jičín
Czech expatriate ice hockey players in Slovakia
Czech ice hockey coaches
Czech expatriate sportspeople in Italy